The Ukrainian–Soviet War is the term commonly used in post-Soviet Ukraine for the conflict between Ukrainian nationalist forces and the Bolsheviks from 1917–21. Many Ukrainians view the war as being between the Ukrainian People's Republic, and the Russian Soviet Federative Socialist Republic and Ukrainian Soviet Socialist Republic. The war ensued soon after the October Revolution, when Lenin dispatched Antonov's expeditionary group to Ukraine and Southern Russia. 

Soviet historiography viewed the Bolshevik victory as the liberation of Ukraine from occupation by the armies of Western and Central Europe, as part of the Russian Civil War and Polish–Soviet War. Conversely, modern Ukrainian historians consider it a failed war of independence by the Ukrainian People's Republic against the Bolsheviks. The conflict was complicated by the involvement of non-nationalist Ukrainians in the Revolutionary Insurgent Army of Ukraine, non-Bolshevik Russians in the White Army, and the armies of the Second Polish Republic, Austria-Hungary, and the German Empire, among others.

Historiography
In Soviet historiography and terminology, the armed conflict is depicted as part of the greater Russian Civil War: in Ukraine, this war was fought between the national government (led by Symon Petliura) and the Bolshevik government (led by Lenin).

The war may be divided into three phases:
 December 1917 – April 1918: Revolutionary days, Bolshevik uprisings, invasion of the Red Guards formations, signing of protectorate treaty, and liberation from bolsheviks.
 December 1918 – December 1919: Civil war in Ukraine, invasion of the Red Army, unification of Ukraine, anti-Soviet peasant uprisings, Denikin's Volunteer Army and the Allied intervention, loss of West Ukraine to Poland.
 Spring 1920 – Autumn 1921: Polish–Soviet War (Treaty of Warsaw), Russian Civil War (between Bolsheviks armies and the Armed Forces of South Russia), Ukrainian guerrilla operations (First and Second Winter Campaigns), government in exile.

Important documents
 Declarations of the Central Council of Ukraine (Universals)
 Ultimatum of Sovnarkom to the Central Council of Ukraine
 Treaty of Brest-Litovsk granting status of neutrality to Ukraine as a bufferzone for the Central Powers, as well as military protection, in negotiating peace with the Bolsheviks of the Russian Soviet Federative Socialist Republic.
 Unification Act, unification of the western Ukraine
 Treaty of Warsaw, Polish-Ukrainian anti-Bolshevik pact
 Peace of Riga, splitting of Ukraine

Background

After the February Revolution of 1917 the nationalities within the tsarist empire (renamed the Russian Republic) demanded national autonomy from Petrograd. In summer of 1917 the Provisional government approved regional administration over some parts of former tsarist Ukraine.

In October 1917 the government of Ukraine denounced the Bolsheviks' armed revolt and declared it would decisively fight against any attempted coup in Ukraine. A special joint committee for preservation of revolution was organized to keep the situation under control. The Kiev Military District command tried to prevent a Bolshevik coup, leading to street fights and eventually surrendering of pro-Bolshevik troops in the city. On November 14, 1917 the Ukrainian Central Rada  issued its "Appeal of the Central Council to the citizens of Ukraine" in which it sanctioned transfer of the state power in Ukraine to itself. On November 16 a joint session of the Rada and executive committee of the local workers and soldiers soviets recognized the Central Rada  as the regional authority in Ukraine. On November 20, 1917 the Rada  declared Ukraine the Ukrainian People's
Republic as an autonomous part of the Russian Republic and scheduled on January 9, 1918 elections to a Ukrainian Constituent Assembly. The Secretary of Military Affairs Symon Petliura expressed his intentions to unite both the Southwestern and Romanian fronts that were stretched across Ukraine into one Ukrainian Front under the command of Colonel General Dmitry Shcherbachev.

On December 17, 1917 the Bolsheviks planned an All-Ukrainian Congress of Soviets and on December 11–12, 1917 they set off a number of uprisings across Ukraine in Kyiv, Odessa, Vinnytsia. They were successfully defeated by the Rada. On December 17, 1917 Sovnarkom, that initiated peace talks with Central Powers earlier that month, sent a 48-hour ultimatum to the Rada requesting it stop "counterrevolutionary actions" or prepare for war. Also on December 17, 1917 Reingold Berzins led his troops from Minsk towards Kharkiv to Don. They engaged in an armed conflict at a rail station in Bakhmach with the Ukrainian troops who refused to let the Red forces (three regiments and an artillery division)  pass. The Central Rada did not accept the accusations and stated its conditions: recognition of the Ukrainian People's Republic, non-interference in its internal affairs and affairs of the newly organized the Ukrainian Front, permission on transferring of Ukrainized troops to Ukraine, division of the former imperial finances, participation of the Ukrainian People's Republic in the general peace negotiations. The same day the All-Ukrainian Congress of Soviets in Kyiv, after the Bolshevik delegation left, recognized the authority of the Ukrainian government and denounced the ultimatum of the Russian government. The Kyiv Bolsheviks in their turn denounced that congress and scheduled another one in Kharkiv. Next day, Sovnarkom in Moscow  decided for war. Vladimir Antonov-Ovseyenko was appointed the commander-in-chief of expeditionary force against Kaledin and the South Russia, while near the borders with
Ukraine (Bryansk – Belgorod) Red troops began to gather.

The Kyivan Bolsheviks who fled to Kharkiv joined the regional Congress of Soviets of the Donetsk-Krivoy Rog Soviet Republic. They then declared this meeting the First All-Ukrainian Congress of Soviets that announced the creation of the Ukrainian People's Republic of Soviets. It called the Central Rada of Ukraine an enemy of the people declaring war against it on January 2. The Rada then broke all ties with Petrograd on January 22, 1918, and declared independence, thereby commencing the Ukrainian War of Independence.  It was around this point that Bolshevik troops began invading Ukraine from Russia. Russian military units from Kharkiv, Moscow, Minsk and the Baltic Fleet invaded Ukraine.

War

December 1917–April 1918

The Bolsheviks, numbering around 30,000 and composed of Russian army regulars stationed at the front, a number of garrisoned units, and Red Guard detachments composed of laborers from Kharkov gubernia and the Donbass, began by advancing from the northeast led by Vladimir Antonov-Ovseenko and Mikhail Muravyov. The Ukrainian forces at the time of the invasion consisted of about 15,000 made up from volunteer detachments and several battalions of the Free Cossacks and the Sich Riflemen.

The invasion of pro-Soviet forces from Russia was accompanied by uprisings initiated in Ukraine by the local Bolsheviks in the developed cities throughout the territory of Left-bank Ukraine as well as Right-bank Ukraine. The Bolsheviks led by Yevgenia Bosch conducted a successful uprising in Vinnytsia sometime in December 1917. They took charge of the 2nd Guard Corps and moved towards Kyiv to help the Bolsheviks in the city. Pavlo Skoropadsky with a regiment of the Free Cossacks managed to stop them near Zhmerynka, disarm them, and deport them to Russia. The other Bolshevik forces captured Kharkiv (December 26), Yekaterinoslav (January 9), Aleksandrovsk (January 15), and Poltava (January 20) on their way to Kyiv. On January 27, the Bolshevik army groups converged in Bakhmach and then set off under the command of Muravyov to take Kyiv.<ref
name=eou>Ukrainian-Soviet War, 1917–21 at the Encyclopedia of Ukraine</ref>

As the Bolsheviks marched towards Kyiv, a small Ukrainian National Republic unit of less than 500 schoolboys (some sources give a figure of 300), commanded by Captain Ahapiy Honcharenko, was hastily organized and sent to the front on January 29, 1918 to take part in the Battle of Kruty. The small unit consisted mainly of the Student Battalion (Kurin) of Sich Riflemen, a unit of the Khmelnytsky Cadet School, and a Haidamaka detachment. About half of the 500 men were killed during the battle.

On January 29, 1918, the Kiev Arsenal January Uprising, a Bolshevik-organized armed revolt, began at the Kiev Arsenal factory. The workers of the plant were joined by the soldiers of the Ponton Battalion, the 3rd Aviation Regiment and the Sahaydachny regiment. Sensing defeat, the "Central Rada" and Petlyurist forces stormed the city on February 3. After six days of battle and running low on food and ammunition, the uprising was suppressed by counter-revolutionary forces,  in which 300 Bolshevik workers died. According to Soviet era sources, more than 1500 pro-Soviet workers and soldiers were killed during the struggle. On February 8 the Ukrainian government evacuated Kyiv in order to avoid destruction by opposing Soviet troops, which then entered Kyiv under Mikhail Muravyov's on February 9.

Once the Bolsheviks took Kyiv, they began an offensive in Right-Bank Ukraine. However, on February 9 the UNR signed the Treaty of Brest-Litovsk and thus received aid from German and Austro-Hungarian troops in late February, over 450,000 troops.  In exchange for military aid, the Ukrainians were to deliver foodstuffs to the Central Powers. Under the command of Symon Petlura, the combined forces pushed the Bolsheviks out of Right Bank Ukraine and retook Kyiv on March 1. Because of the socialist policies of the Rada, mainly the policy of land nationalization which affected food exports to the Central Powers, on April 28 the German forces disbanded the Central Rada and installed the Hetman government in its place. Ukrainian, German, and Austro-Hungarian armies continued making gains, taking back Left Bank Ukraine, Crimea and the Donets Basin. These setbacks forced the Bolsheviks to sign a peace treaty with the Ukrainian government on June 12.

Post-Hetmanate intervention

During November 1918, troops from the Directorate of Ukraine overthrew the Hetmanate with some help from the Bolsheviks. German forces led by the Soldatenrat kept their neutrality during the two-week-long civil war as they were withdrawing from the country, due to the defeat of the German Empire in World War I. The Directorate reestablished the Ukrainian People's Republic. On January 22, 1919 the neighboring Ukrainian Republics united under the Act Zluky.

The Central Military-Revolutionary Committee in Kursk on October 22, 1918 issued the order to form two divisions under the Army Group the Ukrainian Front or the Group of the Kursk Direction. The group was assigned the Worker's Division of Moscow, the 9th Soviet Division, 2nd Orlov Brigade, and two armored trains. According to Antonov-Ovsiyenko the Army accounted for some 6,000 soldiers, 170 artillery guns, 427 machine guns, 15 military planes, and 6 armored trains. On December 15, 1918 the meeting of the Ukrainian chief of staff was called in Kyiv headed by Otaman Osetsky and including the Chief Otaman Petliura, Colonel Bolbachan, Colonel Shapoval, Sotnik Oskilko. They were discussing the border security and formed a plan in case of threat from all sides.

To stop the coming war with the Bolsheviks, the government of Chekhivsky sent a delegation to Moscow led by the Minister of Foreign Affairs Semen Mazurenko. The delegation succeeded in signing a preliminary peaceful agreement yet it did not stop the aggression from the Russian side due to poor communication between the delegation in Moscow and the government of the Ukrainian People's Republic. On December 28, 1918 the Central Committee of the Left UPSR officially declared the mobilization of forces in the support of the Soviet government by an armed staging. From the beginning of January 1919 the Bolshevik bands consistently were crossing the eastern and north-eastern borders to raid.

January 1919–June 1919 

On January 7, 1919 the Bolsheviks invaded Ukraine in full force with an army led by Vladimir Antonov-Ovseyenko, Joseph Stalin, and Volodymyr Zatonsky. The Directorate declared war once again against Russia on January 16 after several preliminary ultimatums to the Russian SFSR sovnarkom to withdraw their troops. The two main directions of the Bolshevik's forces were onto Kyiv and Kharkiv.

During that time the Soviet forces were advancing across North-eastern Ukraine and occupied Rylsk and Novhorod-Siversky. On December 21 the Ukrainian Front took the important strategic railroad connection in Kupyansk. After that, a full-scale advance started between the Dnieper and Oskol Rivers. On January 3, the Red Army took Kharkiv, almost as by the same scenario when Bolsheviks had occupied Kyiv in February 1918. The Ukrainian forces at that time consisted of two regular troop formations, the Zaporozhian Corps and the Sich Riflemen, as well as partisan detachments. These partisans were led by unreliable atamans which occasionally sided with the Bolsheviks, such as Zeleny, Anhel, and Hryhoriv. The army which had over 100,000 men, fell to about 25,000 due to peasants leaving the army and desertions to the Bolsheviks. Bolbochan with the remnants of the Zaporizhian Corps retreated to Poltava which was holding off the Red Army for a couple of weeks more. On January 6, 1919 the government of Pyatakov officially declared the creation of the Ukrainian Socialist Soviet Republic. Yet his government continued to stay in Kursk until January 24. On January 4 the Bolsheviks Army Group Ukrainian Front was reformed into the unified Ukrainian front under the command of Antonov-Ovsiyenko with his deputies Kotsiubynsky and Schadenko. On the several inquiries about the purpose of the Russian Army in Ukraine that the Directory was sending to Moscow, Chicherin finally responded on January 6: ...there is no army of the Russian Socialist Soviet Republic in Ukraine. At this time the military action that takes place on the territory of Ukraine is between the armies of Directory and the Ukrainian Soviet Government which is completely independent. On January 12, the troops under the command of Mykola Schors occupied Chernihiv while other units under command of Pavlo Dybenko took Lozova, Pavlohrad, Synelnykove, and established contact with Nestor Makhno. After some long discussion between the members of the Directory and other state officials, it was decided to declare War against Soviet Russia. The only person who was against it, was the chairman of the Directory Volodymyr Vynnychenko, while Shapoval, for example, for some reason was simply requesting the prompt creation of the Soviet government. Denikin later commented that the war declaration did not change absolutely anything on the frontlines and only reflected the political crisis inside the Ukrainian government with the victory of the military party of Petliura-Konovalets-Hrekov over Vynnychenko-Chekhivsky. On January 20 the Soviet Army took Poltava while the Ukrainian troops retreated further to Kremenchuk. On January 26 Dybenko took Katerynoslav. The Soviets took Left-Bank Ukraine, and then marched on to Kyiv. On February 2 they forced the Directorate to move to Vinnytsia while troops of Schors and Bozhenko occupied Kyiv three days later.

Then Chekhivsky resigned from office, right after Vynnychenko created in Kamyanets-Podilsky the Committee for the salvation of Republic, which was again dissolved by Petliura on February 13. During that time the Soviet troops acquired the rest of the Kiev Governorate while the bands of Hryhoriv took Oleksandria and Yelyzavethrad. By March 6 the Directory had relocated to Proskurov while yielding most of Polissya and Podillya to the Bolsheviks. Surprisingly, by the end of March the Ukrainian armies successfully conducted series of military operations retaking Sarny, Zhytomyr, Korosten, and threatening to take back Kyiv. On March 2 Otaman Hryhoryev occupied Kherson and March 12 he was already in Mykolaiv. By April 3 the Entente forces evacuated from Odessa which Hryhoryev entered three days later. In early June, Ukraine launched an offensive, retaking the Podolia region.

July 1919–December 1919
The Red Army retaliated against the Ukrainian offensive, recapturing Proskurov on 5 July and putting the temporary capital Kamianets-Podilskyi under threat. However, Ukraine was strengthened by the arrival of general Yurii Tiutiunnyk and his experienced troops. The Ukrainian army launched a counterattack, pushing the Red Army back to Horodok. Troops of the Ukrainian Galician Army who had crossed the Zbruch on 16-17 July joined the fight against the Bolsheviks. Their arrival resulted in Ukraine having a combined force of 85,000 Ukrainian army regulars, and 15,000 partisans.

By October 1919, about 70% of the Directorate's troops and more than 90% of the allied Ukrainian Galician Army fell to typhus.

December 1919–November 1920

From December 6, 1919 to May 6, 1920, the UNR Army under the command of Mykhailo Omelianovych-Pavlenko carried out an underground operation known as the First Winter Campaign in the Kirovohrad region against the Soviet 14th Army. Another significant development of this period was the signing of the Treaty of Warsaw with Poland on April 22, and then beginning of a joint offensive with Polish troops against the Bolsheviks. On May 7, a Ukrainian division under the command of Marko Bezruchko entered Kyiv, but was quickly forced out by a Red Army counteroffensive led by Semyon Budyonny. The Ukrainians and Poles were pushed back across the Zbruch River and past Zamość toward Warsaw but counter-offensive the Soviets to Minsk. The Poles signed a armistice with the Soviets on October 12. By 1921, the Polish author of the Polish-Ukrainian alliance, Józef Piłsudski, was no longer the Polish head of state, and
only participated as an observer during the Riga negotiations, which he called an act of cowardice. Petliura's forces kept fighting. They lasted until October 21, when they were forced to cross the Zbruch River and enter Polish-controlled Galicia. There they were disarmed and placed in internment camps.

November 1921

The last action of the UNR against the Soviets was a raid behind the Red Army lines in November 1921 known as the Second Winter Campaign. This campaign was meant to incite a general uprising amongst the Ukrainian peasants, who were already disgruntled with the Soviets, and to unify partisan forces against the Bolsheviks in Ukraine. The commander of the Ukrainian forces was Yurii Tiutiunnyk.

Two expeditionary forces were established, one from Podolia (400 men) and one from Volhynia (800 men). The Podolia group only made it to the village of Vakhnivka, before returning to Polish territory through Volhynia on November 29. The Volhynia group started out on November 4, captured Korosten on November 7 and made its way to the village of Leonivka. When they began to run low on supplies they decided to return. However, on its return west, it was intercepted by a Bolshevik cavalry force under the command of Grigore Kotovski at Bazar and routed in battle near Mali Mynky on November 17. 443 soldiers were captured by the Soviets during the battle. 359 were shot on November 23 near the town of Bazar, and 84 were passed on to Soviet security forces.

This was the last operation of the UNR army against the Soviets. The end of the Second Winter Campaign brought the Ukrainian-Soviet war to a definite end, however partisan fighting against the Bolsheviks continued until mid-1922 and in response the Red Army terrorized the countryside.

Rebellion states
Local supporters of Ukrainian People's Republic created anti-Russian and anti-Bolshevik rebellion states on occupied territories like Independent Medvyn Republic or Kholodny Yar Republic. They kept fighting with Russians and collaborators until 1923.

Aftermath

The end of the war saw the incorporation of most of the territories of Ukraine into the Ukrainian Soviet Socialist Republic which, on December 30, 1922, was one of the founding members of the Union of Soviet Socialist Republics (USSR). Parts of Western Ukraine fell under the control of the Second Polish Republic, as laid out in the Peace of Riga. The UNR government, led by Symon Petlura, was forced into exile.

For the next few years the Ukrainian nationalists would continue to try to wage a partisan guerrilla war on the Soviets. They were aided by Polish intelligence (see Prometheism); however, they were not successful. The last active Ukrainian movements would be mostly eradicated during the Holodomor. Further, the relative lack of Polish support for the Ukrainian cause would cause a growing resentment on the part of the Ukrainian minority in Poland towards the Polish interwar state.

See also
Ukraine after the Russian Revolution
Polish–Soviet War
Polish–Ukrainian War
Nestor Makhno
Ukrainian Death Triangle
Russo-Ukrainian War

References

 
Ukrainian People's Republic
Russian Revolution in Ukraine
Soviet Union–Ukraine relations
Warfare of the late modern period
Wars involving communist states
Wars involving the Soviet Union
Wars involving Russia
Wars involving Ukraine
1917 in Ukraine
1918 in Ukraine
1919 in Ukraine
1920 in Ukraine
1921 in Ukraine
Conflicts in 1917
Conflicts in 1918
Conflicts in 1919
Conflicts in 1920
Conflicts in 1921
History of Ukraine (1918–1991)
Russian–Ukrainian wars
Ukrainian War of Independence